WHEW (1380 AM, "Bonita 1380") is an American radio station licensed to serve the community of Franklin, Tennessee. The station's broadcast license is held by SG Communications, Inc.

Programming
WHEW broadcasts a Spanish Variety format branded as "Bonita 1380".

History
It used to be licensed to an earlier ownership group as WIZO, and was assigned the call sign "WHEW" by the U.S. Federal Communications Commission (FCC) on October 1, 1996. Following a series of missteps by the licensee, WHEW's call sign was deleted from the FCC database and the broadcast license cancelled in August 2012. After a lengthy appeal, the station was fully reinstated in September 2013.

References

External links
Bonita 1380 Nashville Facebook

HEW
HEW
Franklin, Tennessee
Radio stations established in 1975
HEW
Mass media in Williamson County, Tennessee
1973 establishments in Tennessee